Gord's Gold, Vol. 2 is a compilation album released by Canadian singer Gordon Lightfoot in 1988.

Like the first Gord's Gold collection, Vol. 2 features re-recordings of earlier hits alongside the contemporary material. On Gord's Gold only the early songs that didn't match Lightfoot's 1970s sound (and whose original masters were owned by Lightfoot's former label, United Artists) were re-recorded. However, on Vol. 2 all tracks, apart from "Make Way (For the Lady)," "Ghosts of Cape Horn," Baby Step Back," and "It's Worth Believin'" were re-recorded. The album also contains the first appearance of "If It Should Please You," a previously unrecorded song that the band often performed in concert. Some tracks on Vol. 2 that had been released during the 1980s sound almost identical to their original recording. Additionally, the re-recorded tracks were recorded live in the studio.

"Ghosts of Cape Horn" and "It's Worth Believin'" did not appear on the vinyl release.

Track listing
All compositions by Lightfoot:
(† Re-recording  /  ‡ New song)

 "If It Should Please You"‡ – 2:50
 "Endless Wire"† – 4:14 (Original version from Endless Wire)
 "Hangdog Hotel Room"† – 2:47 (Original version from Endless Wire)
 "I'm Not Supposed To Care"† – 3:18 (Original version from Summertime Dream)
 "High and Dry"† – 2:26 (Original version from Sundown)
 "The Wreck of the Edmund Fitzgerald"† – 6:14 (Original version from Summertime Dream)
 "The Pony Man"† – 3:33 (Original version from Sit Down Young Stranger)
 "Race Among the Ruins"† – 3:23 (Original version from Summertime Dream)
 "Christian Island"† – 3:12 (Original version from Don Quixote)
 "All the Lovely Ladies"† – 2:48 (Original version from Cold on the Shoulder)
 "Alberta Bound"† – 2:58 (Original version from Don Quixote)
 "Cherokee Bend"† – 4:57 (Original version from Cold on the Shoulder)
 "Triangle"† – 3:53 (Original version from Shadows)
 "Shadows"† – 2:59 (Original version from Shadows)
 "Make Way (For the Lady)" – 3:40 (from Dream Street Rose)
 "Ghosts of Cape Horn" – 4:06 (from Dream Street Rose)
 "Baby Step Back" – 3:55 (from Shadows)
 "It's Worth Believin'" – 3:25 (from Old Dan's Records)

Session personnel
 Guitar: Gordon Lightfoot, Terry Clements, Red Shea, Dean Parks
 Bass: Rick Haynes, Tom Szczesniak
 Steel Guitar: Pee Wee Charles
 Piano: Mike Heffernan, Michael Omartian
 Drums: Barry Keane
 Strings: Nick DeCaro

Notes 

Gordon Lightfoot albums
1988 greatest hits albums
Warner Records compilation albums